Eric van der Burg (born 9 October 1965) is a Dutch politician, who has served as State Secretary for Justice and Security in the fourth Rutte cabinet since 10 January 2022. A member of the People's Party for Freedom and Democracy (VVD), he was elected to the Senate in 2019. Van der Burg previously had a lengthy political career in the municipality of Amsterdam which culminated in his brief service as ad interim Mayor of Amsterdam in 2017.

Early life and education 
Van der Burg was born in Amsterdam, North Holland, but spent his childhood in Friesland. He later moved back to Amsterdam, where he currently resides. Van der Burg attended the secondary school , where he completed the VWO programme. After graduating, he studied law at the Free University of Amsterdam from 1984 to 1991, but did not obtain a degree.

Early career 
Van der Burg began his political career in 1987, when he served as a district councillor in the Amsterdam district of Zuidoost. In 2001, Van der Burg became a member of the municipal council of Amsterdam, and remained in that role until 2010.

From 2014 to 2019, Van der Burg served two terms as an alderman. His portfolio included health, sport, spatial planning, airports and the district Zuidoost. In 2017, Van der Burg replaced Kajsa Ollongren as acting Mayor of Amsterdam for three months.

Senate 
In June 2019, Van der Burg was elected into the Senate of the States General of the Netherlands. While a member of the Senate, Van der Burg has served on several different committees. From December 2020 to February 2021, van der Berg served as the vice-chairman of the temporary Research Proposal Committee for a parliamentary inquiry into discrimination in the Netherlands. The committee's proposal for an inquiry was accepted, and Van der Burg subsequently served as vice-chairman of the Parliamentary Inquiry Committee on Discrimination in the Netherlands.

State Secretary for Justice and Security 
On 10 January 2022, Van der Burg joined the fourth Rutte cabinet as State Secretary for Justice and Security. While on foreign business, he is allowed to use the title "Minister for Migration".

References

External links 
 
 

1965 births
Living people
21st-century Dutch politicians
Aldermen of Amsterdam
Mayors of Amsterdam
Members of the Senate (Netherlands)
Municipal councillors of Amsterdam
People's Party for Freedom and Democracy politicians
People from Ooststellingwerf
Politicians from Amsterdam
State Secretaries for Justice of the Netherlands